Sesión Metropolitana is the first live album from Mexican Latin pop group Reik, released on July 11, 2006 through Sony BMG. The album was recorded at their concert on October 27, 2005.

Track listing 
 "No Sé Si Es Amor" – 
 "Cuando Estas Conmigo" – 
 "Noviembre Sin Ti" – 
 "Vuelve" – 
 "Amor Primero" – 
 "Que Lloro" – 
 "Cada Mañana" – 
 "Levemente" – 
 "Amarte Duele" – 
 "Qué Vida La Mía" – 
 "Niña" – 
 "Yo Quisiera" – 
 "Como Me Duele" –

Chart performance 

2006 live albums
Reik albums